The dreamers are a family, Oneirodidae, of deep-sea anglerfishes in the order Lophiiformes. They are the largest and most diverse group of deep-sea anglerfish, and also the least well known with 16 genera represented by only one, two, or three female specimens. There are sixty-two species within the family, and that contains more females than males. They are found in deep, temperate waters around the world. The largest female size that is known is about 370-mm and the largest known male is 16.5 mm. Females are dark brown to black all over their entire body, meanwhile males are also dark brown to black, but the nasal area is not pigmented for them. Female dreamers are found in a preservative dark brown to black color externally except for the escal appendages and distal portion of the escal bulb. Males are also the same color, except in their nasal areas.

References
2.  Pietsch, T. W. 1978. A new genus and species of deep-sea anglerfish from the eastern North Pacific Ocean, with a review of the allied genera Leptacanthichthys, Chirophryne, and Ctenochirichthys (family Oneirodidae). Nat. Hist. Mus. Los Angeles Co., Contrib. Sci., 297: 1–25.3. Pietsch, T. W. 1973. A new genus and species of deep-sea anglerfish (Pisces: Oneirodidae) from the northern Pacific Ocean. Copeia, 1973(2): 193–199.

4. Pietsch, Theodore W. 2005. Oneirodidae. Dreamers. Version 5 November 2005 (under construction). http://tolweb.org/Oneirodidae/22026 in The Tree of Life Web Project, http://tolweb.org/

 
Deep sea fish
Marine fish genera
Taxa named by Theodore Gill